Marco Tempest (born December 3, 1964) is a Swiss magician based in New York City. He is known for his multimedia magic and use of interactive technology and computer graphics in his illusions and presentations. He stars in the eight-part television series The Virtual Magician which has been broadcast in over 50 countries.

Career 
Marco Tempest is best known as a magician/performance artist who combines video, computer graphics and other technology of the moment with the ideas and technology of magic.  His television series The Virtual Magician has aired in some 49 markets worldwide.

A native of Zurich, Switzerland, Tempest won numerous awards as a youngster for his use of illusion with contemporary choreography.  While still in his teens, he became one of Europe's top professional magicians as part of the duo United Artists.  Collaborating with Martin Cottet, Tempest presented an unusual four-hands "flash act" in showrooms and on television throughout Europe and Asia.

Style 
In 1989, Tempest began developing his own style with visual and conceptual "dance magic". His show "Key of the Imagination" incorporated a distinctive Eastern style including fans, origami, Kabuki streamers and boomerangs.  Tempest was soon touring worldwide, picking up such honors as New York's World Cup of Magic and Madrid's World Championship of Magic Award.

Tempest's interest in digital technologies generated his unusual performance style, in which an exploration of illusion arts merged with interactive high-tech animation.  The result was his "NeXT Wave of Magic," which premiered in Zurich in December 1991.  Tempest's use of a 32-screen video wall and the latest in techno-music earned him star spots in television variety shows, commercials, performing arts centers and corporate events in the U.S., Japan, France, Monte Carlo, Germany, Spain, and the UK.  His ability to transform logos and products into 3-D animatronics put him much in demand on the corporate market, which became a major focus of his work for the next 15 years.

Performances 
Tempest’s act has been featured in casino shows in the U.S. and around the world, including Dreamstore at Monte Carlo Sporting Club, Magiquest at Harrah's Casino in Atlantic City in 1990, and The Good Time Variety Show at The Showboat Casino Hotel, Atlantic City in 1992.  In the corporate realm, he has made numerous appearances on behalf of Panasonic, Apple, Lucent Technologies, Johnson & Johnson, I.B.M., Toyota, Silicon Graphics, Pfizer, Cisco, Microsoft and many others at corporate events and trade shows since 1991 all around the world.

Tempest created his first full-evening touring show, The Magic of Marco Tempest, which completed a 12-week touring engagement traveling to major theatres throughout Switzerland, Belgium and Holland in the fall of 1995.  The show combined traditional illusion techniques with the latest virtual reality and computer animation techniques, bringing technical special effects to live performance which had, until then, been available only to film and video audiences.

In 1996, Tempest moved to New York City, where he continues to live and work today.  He performs extensively in the corporate market, on television and on the internet.

In 1998 he was awarded France’s top honor for magicians, the Mandrake D’Or.

He began the development of and marketing for his first 13-part television series The Virtual Magician – Keeper of Secrets, beginning in 2000, and the series ran for two seasons (2003–2004) in 49 different markets around the world, and continues in syndication in many of those markets today.  In the series, Tempest played a magician from a future time when technology rules and magic and mystery have died. Using his own secret technologies, he traveled into the digital archives of time and retrieved the greatest mysteries from the past.  He brought those mysteries into our time and performed them for people in everyday situations – on the street, in restaurants, etc.  The theme and main character of The Virtual Magician have been carried forward in Tempest’s more recent television appearances around the world, particularly in his Magic of Marco Tempest television specials in Japan (2006-2007) and Korea (spring 2007).

On November 13, 2011, Tempest was featured on an episode of CNN's The Next List.

Phonecam Magic 
In 2006, Tempest began posting “Phonecam” magic on YouTube and other popular viral video sites.  Initially, the postings were a challenge in response to magicians on television shows who had used either special camera tricks, editing, or digital effects to present magic which was only possible in that medium. The rules are:

Shoot the magic on a phonecam in one take.  No cuts, no edits.
The magic must be original – nothing from a book or that other magicians are doing.

Tempest’s first phonecam trick, in which he caused a borrowed umbrella to shrink visibly on camera, was later picked up and featured on The Tonight Show with Jay Leno, and a later version earned him a spot on HBO’s Comedy Festival shot at Caesars Palace in Las Vegas.

Magic Projection 
Tempest does a performance holding a blank canvas that moving images are projected onto; the images adapt and change to the moving of the canvas.

Awards 
2011 World Technology Award for Arts
2010 International Magicians Society Merlin Award for Best Contemporary Magician
2009 World Magic Award - Best Contemporary Magic
2005 23rd Loie Award for Outstanding Achievement in the Art of Magic
2003 Two Telly Awards for The Virtual Magician television series
2002 Two Aegis Awards for The Virtual Magician television series
2002 Two Axiem Awards for The Virtual Magician television series
2001 Five Omni Awards for The Virtual Magician television series
1998 Mandrake d'Or Award, Societe de la Magie, Paris
1987 1st Place at the World Cup of Magic / New York Magic Symposium, New York City

References

External links 
 

Living people
American magicians
1964 births